Miksa (Max) Fleissig (10 November 1845, in Csenger – 23 January 1919) was a Hungarian-born Austrian chess master.

Dr. Maximilian Fleissig tied for 7-8th in the Vienna 1873 chess tournament (Wilhelm Steinitz and Joseph Henry Blackburne won),  played (scoring 5.5/12) at Vienna 1875 (Philipp Meitner won), and tied for 4-7th at Vienna 1882 (Vincenz Hruby won).

His name is attached to the Fleissig Gambit in the Sicilian (1.e4 c5 2.d4 cxd4 3.c3).

Max (Miksa) Fleissig was the elder brother of Bernhard Fleissig.

References

External links
 

1845 births
1919 deaths
People from Csenger
Hungarian Jews
Austrian Jews
Hungarian chess players
Austrian chess players
Jewish chess players
19th-century chess players